Kenneth Moore Jr. (born August 23, 1995) is an American football cornerback for the Indianapolis Colts of the National Football League (NFL). He played college football at Valdosta State, and signed with the New England Patriots as an undrafted free agent in 2017.

Early years
Moore did not play football until his senior year at Lowndes High School in Valdosta, Georgia. He recorded 18 tackles, two interceptions, and two pass breakups in 2012. Lowndes had a 9–2 record and advanced to the GHSA Class AAAAAA Playoffs. He also participated in soccer, basketball and track at Lowndes.

College career
Moore played for the Valdosta State Blazers of Valdosta State University from 2013 to 2016. He began his college career as a cornerback and converted to safety his senior season. He played in 10 games, starting one, in 2013, recording 12 solo tackles, six tackle assists and one interception. Moore played in all 13 games in 2014, totaling 26 solo tackles, 11 tackle assists, five pass breakups, two interceptions, and one forced fumble. He played in 12 games in 2015, recording 34 solo tackles, 17 tackle assists, one sack, six pass breakups and three interceptions, two of which were returned for touchdowns. He earned First-team All-GSC, D2CAA Second-team All-Super Region Two and USA College Football Division II Second-team All-American honors in 2015. Moore played in 11 games in 2016, totaling 45 solo tackles, 20 tackle assists, one sack, eight pass breakups and five interceptions. He garnered GSC All-Academic, Second-team All-GSC, D2CAA Second-team All-Super Region Two, HERO Sports D2 First-team All-American and AFCA First-team All-American recognition in 2016. His 11 career interceptions ranked fifth all-time in school history. Moore majored in mass media at Valdosta State. In January 2017, he played in the Tropical Bowl, a college football all-star game.

Professional career

New England Patriots

2017
On May 5, 2017, the New England Patriots signed Moore to a three-year, $1.66 million contract that includes a signing bonus of $2,000 as an undrafted free agent.

Throughout training camp, Moore competed for a roster spot as a backup cornerback against Cyrus Jones, Justin Coleman, D. J. Killings, and Dwayne Thomas. On September 2, 2017, the New England Patriots waived Moore as part of their final roster cuts despite a strong performance in training camp and the preseason.

Indianapolis Colts

2017 season
On September 3, 2017, the Indianapolis Colts claimed Moore off of waivers. Head coach Chuck Pagano named Moore the fifth cornerback on the depth chart to begin the regular season, behind Vontae Davis, Rashaan Melvin, Nate Hairston, and Quincy Wilson.

He made his professional regular season debut in the Indianapolis Colts’ season-opener at the Los Angeles Rams and made one solo tackle during their 46–9 loss. In Week 13, Moore earned his first career start after Rashaan Melvin sustained a hand injury. He finished the Colts’ 30–10 loss at the Jacksonville Jaguars with five combined tackles. Moore remained a starting cornerback for the remaining four games after Rashaan Melvin was officially placed on injured reserve. On December 14, 2017, Moore recorded six combined tackles, broke up two pass attempts, and made his first career interception during a 25–13 loss against the Denver Broncos in Week 15. Moore intercepted a pass by Broncos’ quarterback Trevor Siemian, that was originally intended for wide receiver Demaryius Thomas, and returned it for a 25-yard gain during the first quarter. He finished his rookie season in 2017 with 38 combined tackles (32 solo), five pass deflections, and one interception in 16 games and five starts. On December 31, 2017, the Indianapolis Colts fired head coach Chuck Pagano after they finished the season with a 4–12 record.

2018 season
Throughout training camp, Moore competed to be a starting cornerback against Nate Hairston, Quincy Wilson, and Pierre Desir. Head coach Frank Reich named Moore and Nate Hairston the starting cornerback duo to begin the regular season.

He started in the Colts' season-opener against the Cincinnati Bengals and recorded three combined tackles, deflected a pass, and made an interception during a 34–23 loss. Moore was inactive for the Colts’ Week 5 loss at the New England Patriots due to a concussion. In Week 11, he collected a season-high ten combined tackles (nine solo) and was credited with half a sack as the Colts defeated the Tennessee Titans 38–10. He finished the season with 77 combined tackles (63 solo), 11 pass deflections, three interceptions, and 1.5 sacks in 15 games and 15 starts. Moore received an overall grade of 71.8 from Pro Football Focus, which ranked 32nd among all qualifying cornerbacks in 2018.

2019 season
On June 13, 2019, Moore signed a four-year, $36 million extension with the Colts. The deal included $18 million guaranteed, and made him the highest-paid slot cornerback in the league.

In Week 9 against the Pittsburgh Steelers, Moore recorded his first interception of the season off Mason Rudolph and returned the ball for 35 yards in the 26–24 loss.
In Week 10 against the Miami Dolphins, Moore recovered a fumble forced by teammate Shaquille Leonard on tight end Mike Gesicki in the 16–12 loss.
In Week 11 against the Jacksonville Jaguars, Moore recorded a team-high eight tackles and sacked Nick Foles in the 33–13 win. In Week 12 against the Houston Texans, Moore picked off Deshaun Watson in the second quarter of the 20–17 loss. His 2019 season received a grade of 75.5 from Pro Football Focus.

2020 season
In Week 2 against the Minnesota Vikings, Moore recorded his first interception of the season off a pass thrown by Kirk Cousins during the 28–11 win.
In Week 3 against the New York Jets, Moore recorded his first sack of the season on Sam Darnold during the 36–7 win. In Week 8 against the Detroit Lions, Moore recorded an interception off a pass thrown by Matthew Stafford and returned it for a 29 yard touchdown during the 41–21 win. In Week 14 against the Las Vegas Raiders, Moore made a spectacular one-handed interception off a pass thrown by Derek Carr during the Colts' 44–27 win.  During the game, Moore also forced a fumble on Hunter Renfrow that was recovered by the Colts.
Moore was named the AFC Defensive Player of the Week for his performance in Week 14.

2021 season
Moore started all 17 games and totaled 101 tackles (81 solo), 6.0 tackles for loss, 1.0 sack, 13 passes defensed, four interceptions, one forced fumble and one special teams stop. He was one of only two NFL defensive backs to register 100 tackles and at least 10 passes defensed in 2021. Moore was named to his first career Pro Bowl. He was also the team's nominee for the Walter Payton Man Of The Year Award.

2022 season
Moore returned as a starting cornerback for the Colts. He started the first 12 games before suffering an ankle injury in Week 12. He missed the next four weeks before being placed on injured reserve on January 4, 2023. He finished the season with 65 tackles, one sack, and four passes defensed through 12 starts.

NFL career statistics

References

External links
Indianapolis Colts bio
Valdosta State Blazers bio

Living people
1995 births
Players of American football from Georgia (U.S. state)
People from Valdosta, Georgia
American football cornerbacks
American football safeties
African-American players of American football
Valdosta State Blazers football players
New England Patriots players
Indianapolis Colts players
21st-century African-American sportspeople
American Conference Pro Bowl players